Wireless was an Australian-Canadian rock band active from 1976 to 1980. The band recorded three albums during their career: 
Wireless, Positively Human Relatively Sane and No Static.

History
Wireless was formed in 1976 by bassist Allan Marshall, guitarist Steve McMurray and drummer Glenn Beatson, who had played together in an Australian pop music band, Autumn. They released a self-titled album on the Atlantic label which included some original songs.

The band soon signed with WEA Music.

The band's album Positively Human Relatively Sane  did not sell well; the next album, No Static, was produced by Geddy Lee. The albums were later remastered and released by Rock Candy Records.

Members
Mike Crawford - Guitar, vocals
Allan Marshall - Bass, vocals
Steve McMurray - Guitar, vocals
Marty Morin - drums
Glenn Beatson - Drums
Mike Lalonde - Vocals
Lawrence DelGrande - Keyboard, vocals

Discography 
 Wireless (1976)
 Positively Human Relatively Sane (1978)
 No Static (1980)

References

External links 
Gary Lessard's Wireless Web site
Peacedogman's review of No Static
Autumn - pre-Wireless band

Canadian rock music groups
Anthem Records artists
Musical groups established in 1976
Musical groups disestablished in 1980
Musical groups from Toronto
1976 establishments in Ontario
1980 disestablishments in Ontario